Quercus × bebbiana (or Quercus bebbiana), known as Bebb's oak, is a naturally occurring hybrid of white oak (Quercus alba) and burr oak (Quercus macrocarpa). It occurs where their ranges overlap in the eastern United States and eastern Canada. It was named for Michael Schuck Bebb (1833–1895), an Illinois botanist who specialized in willows (Salix). Its parents are both placed in Quercus sect. Quercus.

A tree reaching 15m, and available from specialty nurseries, its acorns are sweet enough to be palatable to humans.

References

bebbiana
Flora of North America
Plants described in 1904
Plant nothospecies